Edward Heynes (by 1524 – 1575 or later), of Devizes, Wiltshire, was an English politician.

He was a Member (MP) of the Parliament of England for Devizes in November 1554, 1559 and 1563.

References

Year of death missing
People from Devizes
English MPs 1554–1555
English MPs 1559
English MPs 1563–1567
Year of birth uncertain